Paul Hermelin (born April 30, 1952) is the chairman of Capgemini.

Early life and education 
Hermelin graduated from the Ecole Polytechnique in 1972 and the Ecole Nationale d’Administration (ENA) in 1978.

Career 
Hermelin spent the second fifteen years of his professional life in the French government, primarily in  the  Ministry  of  Finance. He started his career in Jacques Delors's Ministry of the Economy. From 1988 to 1991, he worked in Hubert Curien's Ministry of Research and Technology. From 1991 to 1993, he worked in Dominique Strauss-Kahn's Ministry of Industry and Foreign Trade as chief of staff.

Hermelin joined Capgemini in May 1993 where he was in charge of coordinating central functions and was appointed as the CEO of the Capgemini Group on January 1, 2002. In May 2012, Hermelin became chairman and CEO of the Capgemini Group.

In May 2020, Aiman Ezzat succeeded Hermelin as chief executive officer and Paul Hermelin continues as chairman of the board of directors.

In January 2013, Hermelin was appointed by Minister of Foreign Affairs Laurent Fabius as France's Special Representative for Economic Relations with India.

Other activities 
 Institut Montaigne, Member of the Board of Directors

References 

Capgemini people
1952 births
Living people
Lycée Saint-Louis alumni
École Polytechnique alumni
École nationale d'administration alumni
French chief executives